Les Wood was a former football (soccer) player who represented New Zealand at international level.

Wood made his full All Whites debut in a 1–4 loss to Australia on 18 July 1936 and ended his international playing career with five A-international caps and one goal to his credit, his final cap an appearance in a 1–4 loss to South Africa on 19 July 1947.

References 

Year of birth missing (living people)
Possibly living people
New Zealand association footballers
New Zealand international footballers
Association football forwards